was an annual music awards on the produced by Nippon Television.

Grand Prix winners

See also 
Star Tanjō!

References 
 音楽・芸能賞事典 Nichigai Associates 
 音楽・芸能賞事典 Nichigai Associates 1990/95 

Japanese music awards
Awards established in 1975
Awards disestablished in 1975
1975 establishments in Japan
1990 disestablishments in Japan
Annual television shows
Annual events in Japan